Wild, Free & Reckless is the third album by American country musician Wayne Hancock, released on August 3, 1999.

Track listing
All songs written by Wayne Hancock except where noted.
 "Kansas City Blues" 3:08
 "Lookin' For Better Days" - 4:15
 "Flatland Boogie" - 3:27
 "Smell That Bread" - 2:58
 "Blue Suede Shoes" - 3:12
 "Tonight The Rain Is Coming Down" - 3:30
 "Drive On" - 5:11
 "Going Back To Texas" - 3:29
 "Wild, Free & Reckless" - 3:18
 "That's Why I Ride" - 4:26
 "It's Saturday Night" - 2:31
 "Gone Gone Gone" - 2:56
 "Gonna Be Some Trouble Tonite" - 2:35
 "Mornin' Noon and Night" - 6:19
 "You Don't Have To Cry" - 3:29

Personnel 

Wayne Hancock – Acoustic Guitar and vocals
Ric Ramerez - Upright Bass
Jeremy Wakefield - Steel-guitar

See also
 1999 in music

References

External links
 Wayne "The Train" Hancock's Official web site  
 [ Wayne Hancock on Allmusic] 
 Wayne Hancock on rockabilly.net 
 Wayne Hancock collection at the Internet Archive's live music archive

Wayne Hancock albums
1999 albums